Litsea leytensis is a species of plant in the family Lauraceae. It is endemic to the Philippines.  It is threatened by habitat loss.

References

Flora of the Philippines
leytensis
Vulnerable plants
Flora of the Visayas
Taxonomy articles created by Polbot
Taxa named by Elmer Drew Merrill